Sorbus sitchensis, commonly known as western mountain ash and Sitka mountain-ash, is a small shrub of northwestern North America.

Description
A multistemmed shrub, it is endemic to northwestern North America, from the Pacific coast of Alaska, to the mountains of Washington, Oregon and northern California and eastward to parts of Idaho and western Alberta and Montana. It is widespread in British Columbia.

The otherwise similar Sorbus scopulina  has yellow-green sharp-pointed leaflets that are sharply serrated over most of their length.

 Winter buds Not sticky with rusty hairs.
 Leaves Alternate, compound, six to ten inches long,   Leaflets seven to ten, blue-green, lanceolate or long oval, with rounded tip, toothed usually from the middle to the end. In autumn they turn yellow, orange and red.  Stipules leaf-like, caducous.
 Flowers After the leaves are fully grown, June through September.  White, small, 80 or fewer, borne in flat compound cymes three or four inches across.
 Fruit Berry-like pome, globular, one-quarter of an inch across, bright pinkish red, borne in cymous clusters. They are enjoyed by the Richardson's grouse.

Uses 
While not choice eating, the fruits are consumed by some birds in winter.

References

sitchensis
Flora of Subarctic America
Flora of Western Canada
Flora of the Northwestern United States
Flora of the Southwestern United States